The Hivra River (Marathi: हिवरा नदी) is a notable river crossing the town by Wadi, Banoti, Khadakdeola and Pachora in the Indian state of Maharashtra.

Hivra River originates from Ghatnandra Hills in Maharashtra state in India and flows through Aurangabad and 
Jalgaon district. The Hivra River passes by Wadi, Banoti, Varthan, Ghorkund, Mhashikotha, Khadakdeola, Sarola, and Pachora.

Irrigation
The government of Maharashtra has constructed a dam over the river known as the Hivra Dam which provides irrigation water to the neighbouring villages.

Gallery

See also
Hivra Dam
Khadakdeola

References

External links
Info about Rivers
Hivra River Info

Rivers of Maharashtra
Jalgaon district
Rivers of India